Pichuva Kaththi ( Small curved knife) is a 2017 Indian Tamil-language action drama film written and directed by Ayappan. The film features Inigo Prabhakaran and Anisha Xavier in the lead roles, with an ensemble cast of actors including Yogi Babu, Rajendran, Ramesh Thilak, Bala Saravanan, and Kaali Venkat in pivotal roles. The film began production during mid-2016 and was released on 22 September 2017 to mixed review from critics.

Cast

Inigo Prabhakaran as Prabha
Anisha Xavier as Meena
C. M. Senguttuvan
Sri Priyanka
Yogi Babu as Babu
Ramesh Thilak as Ramesh
Bala Saravanan
Rajendran
Kaali Venkat
R. N. R. Manohar
Sujatha Sivakumar
Yaar Kannan
Cool Suresh
Cheranraj

Production
The film was shot across Kumbakonam in early 2017, with Rajendran briefly injured during the shoot. The producer of the film, C. Mathaiyan, cast his son C. M. Senguttuvan in a secondary leading role and cast newcomer Anisha Xavier opposite him.

Soundtrack

The film's music was composed by N. R. Raghunanthan, while the audio rights of the film were acquired by Trend Music. The album was released on 16 April 2017 and featured seven songs.

Release
Pichuva Kaththi had a theatrical release across Tamil Nadu alongside eight other films, which became the most crowded release date of 2017 in Chennai. The film opened on 22 September 2017 to mixed reviews, with the critic from The Times of India stating the film "despite a not-so-bad plot, Pichuva Kaththi doesn't succeed to engage the viewers because of its watered-down narration and ineffective sequences" and that "the climax of the film, which had ample scope for a riveting sequence, ends up as a mediocre sequence with unconvincing execution".

References

2017 films
2010s Tamil-language films
Films set in Chennai
Films shot in Chennai
Indian action thriller films
2017 directorial debut films
2017 action thriller films